Gytha Thorkelsdóttir ( 997 – c. 1069), also called Githa, was a Danish noblewoman. She was the wife of Godwin, Earl of Wessex and the mother of King Harold Godwinson and of Edith of Wessex, who was the queen consort of King Edward the Confessor.

Biography

Gytha Thorkelsdóttir  was the daughter of Danish chieftain Thorgil Sprakling (also called Thorkel).   Gytha was also the sister of the Danish Earl Ulf Thorgilsson who was married to Estrid Svendsdatter, the sister of King Cnut the Great. She married the Anglo-Saxon nobleman Godwin of Wessex. They had a large family together, and one of her sons, Harold, became king of England.

Two of their sons, Harold and Tostig, faced each other at the Battle of Stamford Bridge, where Tostig was killed. Less than a month later, three of her sons, Harold, Gyrth, and Leofwine, were killed at the Battle of Hastings. Shortly after the Battle of Hastings, Gytha was living in Exeter and may have been the cause of that city's rebellion against William the Conqueror in 1067, which resulted in his laying siege to the city.    She pleaded unsuccessfully with him for the return of the body of her slain son, king Harold. According to the Anglo-Saxon Chronicle, Gytha left England after the Norman conquest, together with the wives or widows and families of other prominent Anglo-Saxons, all the Godwin family estates having been confiscated by William. Little else is known of Gytha's life after that time, although it is probable that she went to Scandinavia where she had relatives.

Her surviving (and youngest) son, Wulfnoth, lived nearly all his life in captivity in Normandy until the death of William the Conqueror in 1087. Only her eldest daughter, Queen Edith (d. 1075), still held some power (however nominal) as the widow of King Edward the Confessor.

Children
Sweyn Godwinson, Earl of Herefordshire, (c. 1020–1052), at some point he declared himself an illegitimate son of Canute the Great but this is considered to be a false claim
Harold Godwinson, King of England (c. 1022 – October 14, 1066)
Edith of Wessex, (c. 1025 – December 19, 1075), queen consort of Edward the Confessor
Tostig Godwinson, Earl of Northumbria (c. 1026 – September 25, 1066)
Gyrth Godwinson, Earl of East Anglia (c. 1030 – October 14, 1066)
Gunhilda of Wessex, a nun (c. 1035–1080)
Leofwine Godwinson, Earl of Kent (c. 1035 – October 14, 1066)
Ælfgifu of Wessex, (c. 1035)
Wulfnoth Godwinson, (c. 1040–1094)

See also
House of Wessex family tree
Cnut the Great's family tree

References

Related Reading
Barlow, Frank (1988)  The Feudal Kingdom of England 1042–1216 (New York: Longman) 
DeVries, K. (1999)  The Norwegian Invasion of England in 1066 (Woodbridge, UK: Boydell Press) 
Mason, Emma (2004) House of Godwine: The History of Dynasty (London: Hambledon & London) 
Rex, Peter (2005) Harold II: The Doomed Saxon King (Stroud, UK: Tempus) 
Walker, Ian (2000) Harold the Last Anglo-Saxon King (Gloucestershire: Wrens Park)

External links
 

Anglo-Norse women
Anglo-Saxon women
House of Godwin
Gytha
11th-century English women
990s births
1069 deaths
11th-century Danish women
Medieval Danish nobility
Danish royalty
Year of birth uncertain